Manor Farm Swallet is a cave in the limestone of the Mendip Hills, in Somerset, England which was subject to numerous failed digging attempts between 1947 and 1973 as the surface shafts kept collapsing.
  In 1973 access to the cave was gained by an artificial shaft and walling it against collapse.

References

Caves of the Mendip Hills
Limestone caves